Jarvis "J. J." Greer, Jr. (born February 4, 1991) is an American soccer player who plays as a defender.

Career

College and amateur
Greer played five years of college soccer at the University of Memphis between 2009 and 2013. While at college, Greer also appeared for USL PDL club's Mississippi Brilla and Portland Timbers U23s.

Professional career
Greer signed with USL Pro club Charlotte Eagles on March 7, 2014.

Greer signed with USL Pro's Colorado Springs Switchbacks on January 29, 2015.

Greer signed with Phoenix Rising FC on November 15, 2016.

References

1991 births
Living people
American soccer players
Memphis Tigers men's soccer players
Mississippi Brilla players
Portland Timbers U23s players
Charlotte Eagles players
Colorado Springs Switchbacks FC players
Phoenix Rising FC players
Association football defenders
Soccer players from Tennessee
USL League Two players
USL Championship players